The Baja 500 is a Mexican off-road motorsport race on the Baja California Peninsula that is sanctioned by SCORE International. The course has remained relatively the same over the years with the majority of events being a loop race starting and finishing in Ensenada. Race course mileage varies and is usually slightly under 500 miles.

The event includes various types of vehicle classes such as Trophy trucks, Dirtbikes, Truggy, Baja Bugs, Buggies and custom fabricated race vehicles.

Current and past classes

Cars and Trucks
SCORE Trophy Truck: Open Production Unlimited Trucks.
SCORE Trophy Truck Legends: Open Production Unlimited Trucks ford Drivers 50 years and older.
SCORE Trophy Truck Spec: Open Production Unlimited Trucks with stock / sealed V-8 Engines / 2wd.
SCORE Class 1: Unlimited open-wheel single-or two-seaters.
SCORE Class 1/2-1600: Limited suspension. open-wheel single-or two-seaters. (1600cc)
SCORE Class 2: Limited 2.2 liter buggy.
SCORE Class 3: Production short wheelbase 4x4 Jeeps.
SCORE Class 4: Unlimited 2.2 liter open wheel.
SCORE Class 5: Unlimited Baja Bugs.
SCORE Class 5-1600: Baja Bugs. (1600cc)
SCORE Class 6: V6 powered tube chassis trucks
SCORE Class 7: Open mini trucks.
SCORE Class 7S: Stock mini trucks. (3000cc)
SCORE Class 7SX: Modified mini trucks. (4000cc)
SCORE Class 8: Full-sized two-wheel drive trucks.
SCORE Class 9: Short wheelbase, open-wheel. single-or two-seaters. (1600cc)
SCORE Class 10: Open-wheel single or two-seaters. (2000cc)
SCORE Class 11: Stock VW Sedans. (1600cc)
SCORE Lites Class 12: VW limited open-wheel. single seat (1776cc) or two-seaters (1835cc).
SCORE Class 17: Production short wheelbase 4x4 Modified Jeeps.
SCORE Stock Full: Stock full-sized trucks.
SCORE Stock Mini: Stock mini trucks. (4300cc)
SCORE Baja Challenge:  Limited, identical open-wheel Baja touring cars.
SCORE Sportsman Buggy:
SCORE Sportsman Truck:
SCORE Sportsman UTV: 660cc, 4-wheel utility vehicle.
ProTruck: Limited Production Trucks governed by the Baja ProTruck Off-Road Race Series

Motorcycles
SCORE Class 20: 125cc or smaller two-stroke and 250cc or smaller four-stroke motorcycles.
SCORE Class 21: 126cc to 250cc.
SCORE Class 22: 250cc or more.
SCORE Class 30: Riders over 30 years old.
SCORE Class 40: Riders over 40 years old.
SCORE Class 50: Riders over 50 years old.
SCORE Class 60: Riders over 60 years old.

ATVs
SCORE Class 24: 250cc or less.
SCORE Class 25: 251cc or more.

Overall winners

See also
 SCORE International
 Baja 1000
 Baja 400
 San Felipe 250

References

SCORE International (2011). "2011-2015 Off-Road Racing Rules and Regulations".
SCORE International. " 2009 New Classes & Existing Class Rule Amendments"

External links
Official SCORE International website
Official SCORE International Journal
Official SCORE International Carbon TV channel

Auto races in Mexico
Motorcycle races
Rally raid races
Sports competitions in Baja California